Sonia Rescalvo Zafra (1946 – 6 October 1991) was a Spanish trans woman who was murdered by a group of neo-Nazis in the Parc de la Ciutadella in Barcelona on 6 October 1991. Her murder is notable for being the first known case in Spain of a person being murdered for being transgender.

Background 
Sonia was born in Cuenca, Spain in 1946 to parents Leopoldo Rescalvo and Dolores Zafra. She moved to Barcelona at the age of 16 and began working as a showgirl in theatres on the Avinguda del Paral·lel. Later in life, she fell on hard times and became homeless and addicted to drugs, turning to sex work to survive.

Murder 
Sonia and a friend, known as Dori or Doris, were sleeping rough at a bandstand in Barcelona's Parc de la Ciutadella in the early hours of 6 October 1991 when they were abruptly attacked by a group of six teenage skinheads from the Boixos Nois, who gave them repeated kicks to the head while wearing steel-toe boots. Sonia was killed in the attack and her friend was seriously injured; three other people sleeping at the bandstand were also attacked.

Media coverage

Investigation and trial 
An investigation was launched by the Mossos d'Esquadra and became the force's first murder inquiry since its recent redeployment in Catalonia. Police treated the attack as a hate crime, even though Spanish criminal law at that time did not distinguish between crimes motivated by prejudice and others.

In March 1992, seven people were arrested and charged in connection with the murder: Pere Alsina Llinares, David Parladé Valdés, Héctor and Isaac López Frutos, Andrés Pascual Prieto, Oliver Sánchez Riera and Óscar Lozano. Police found weapons such as brass knuckles and baseball bats, as well as neo-Nazi and Boixos Nois paraphernalia in searches of their homes. The court in Barcelona found that the attackers were hostile to LGBT people and knew the bandstand was regularly used by LGBT people as a place to sleep.

In June 1994, six of the suspects were convicted of participating in the attack and given prison sentences ranging from 23 to 50 years, while the seventh, Lozano, was fined 100,000 pesetas for knowing of the murder and not reporting it. In 1996, the attackers' sentences were reduced by the Supreme Court of Spain. All six have since been released from prison.

Aftermath 

In 1993, a plaque commemorating Sonia was installed on the bandstand where she was murdered. In 2013, the bandstand was officially renamed Glorieta de la Transsexual Sònia in her memory.

References 

1991 murders in Spain
LGBT history in Spain
Neo-Nazism
Persecution of LGBT people
Violence against women in Spain
Violence against trans women
1991 in LGBT history